Macoubea is a genus of plant in the family Apocynaceae first described as a genus in 1775. It is native to  South America and Central America.

Species
 Macoubea guianensis Aubl. - Venezuela, Colombia, Peru, N Brazil, the 3 Guianas
 Macoubea mesoamericana J.F.Morales - Costa Rica, Panama
 Macoubea sprucei (Müll.Arg.) Markgr. - Costa Rica, Panama, Venezuela, Colombia, Peru, NW Brazil

formerly included
Macoubea fasciculata (Poir.) Lemée = Parahancornia fasciculata (Poir.) Benoist

References

Apocynaceae genera
Rauvolfioideae